Cold Hatton is a small village in Shropshire, located approximately six miles south of Hodnet near the confluence of the River Tern and River Meese. It is in the civil parish of Ercall Magna. Since 1998 it has been part of the Telford and Wrekin unitary district.

Etymology
The name Hatton is derived from the Old English hæþ-tun, meaning "settlement on the heath". The affix "cold", in English placenames, usually is taken to refer to a village's cold or exposed location. There is another hamlet called Cold Hatton Heath immediately to the east.

History
The area was formerly a manor held by Lilleshall Abbey, and later formed part of the estates of the Duke of Sutherland, who had a number of houses built in the village using local red sandstone.

References

Villages in Shropshire